Cameraria hamadryadella, the solitary oak leafminer, is a moth of the family Gracillariidae. It is widely distributed in temperate North America.

The wingspan is 6.5-8.5 mm. Adults are on wing in spring in two generations per year.

The larvae feed on Gaylussacia and Quercus species, including Quercus alba, Quercus benderi, Quercus bicolor, Quercus coccinea, Quercus ilicifolia, Quercus lyrata, Quercus macrocarpa, Quercus macrocarpa, Quercus marilandica, Quercus obtusiloba, Quercus prinoides, Quercus prinus, Quercus robur, Quercus rubra, Quercus stellata and Quercus velutina. They mine the leaves of their host plant. The mine consists of an upperside blotch. They overwinter in leaf litter as diapausing larvae within the leaf mine.

References

Cameraria (moth)
Moths of North America
Leaf miners
Taxa named by James Brackenridge Clemens
Moths described in 1859
Lepidoptera of Canada
Lepidoptera of the United States